Ruth Evershed is a fictional Senior Intelligence Analyst seconded from GCHQ to MI5, featured in the British television series Spooks, also known as MI-5 in the United States.  Ruth was played by Nicola Walker from the time the character joined the show in 2003, until Walker left to have a baby in 2006. She returned in 2009 and continued her role until her character's death in the final episode of series 10.

Background
Ruth was a graduate of Corpus Christi College, Oxford, where she studied Classics. After obtaining her degree she applied for a job in GCHQ. It is established that she was fluent in multiple languages including Greek, French, Latin, Russian, Arabic, Mandarin Chinese and Wu Chinese. She proclaimed that her Cantonese is "horrible".

Initial tenure
Ruth was introduced in Series 2 as an intelligence analyst, seconded from GCHQ. Although initially asked to spy for GCHQ, her supreme intelligence amongst other qualities quickly made her an established and trusted member of the team. She formed strong bonds with Tom Quinn, Zoe Reynolds, Danny Hunter and in particular Harry Pearce.

During her time in MI5, a romance starts to develop between Ruth and Harry. Although at first they refuse to act on their feelings, refraining from ever mentioning that something more existed between them, Harry is eventually goaded to act when he is called on his relationship with Ruth by Juliet Shaw after a failed coup d'état from within the British intelligence community at the start of Series 5. In the next episode, he finally asked her to dinner, which she accepts. The date goes well and they bond over their desire to travel for something other than their work, and Ruth is intrigued by Harry's implicit offer that she could travel with him on such a tour. But Ruth, ashamed when people start rumours about their relationship, calls it off at the end of the episode.

Temporary departure
Ruth's final episode was series 5 episode 5, "The Message". She witnesses the suicide of Mik Maudsley, Head of Security at Cotterdam Prison, which was under investigation after a fire which occurred there, killing seven terror suspects. She is suspected of Maudsley's murder. Evidence proving this was faked by Oliver Mace, in order to persuade Harry to join a group that supports torture. Although Harry is willing to go to prison to save her, instead she fakes her own death so that he can continue to fight for MI5. Meeting for their final goodbye, Harry tries to declare his love for Ruth but she tells him to leave it as "something wonderful, that was never said." She and Harry share a goodbye kiss as she leaves on a barge to venture into the unknown.

Return
Ruth returns in series 8 episode 1, after she and her household are attacked.  Ruth had settled down in Polis, Cyprus with a Cypriot doctor and his son. She is told that Harry has been abducted. Lucas and Ros realise that Harry and Ruth share knowledge that the abductors want. During the ensuing case, the doctor is shot dead. Ruth is willing to give up the knowledge to save the boy but Harry refuses, leading to a falling out between them even though the boy survives. Since Ruth and the doctor were never married, she does not have legal guardianship and the boy returns to Cyprus to live with his aunt. Harry tells Ruth he will "sort things out" for her since she is back in the UK, despite being legally dead. He also says she can come back to Section D if she needs work.

Ruth returns to the grid full-time in episode 3, quickly slotting back into her old role while remaining ambivalent about the cost of involvement. At the end of that episode she is left distraught after friend and colleague Jo is killed in a hostage situation. With Harry's support, she moves on and works alongside the team in its operations against the growing threat of Nightingale.

After Ros's death, Harry asks Ruth to marry him. Ruth declines, but later reveals her refusal isn't because she doesn't love him, but that, after all they had gone through together they had already become soul-mates, and didn't need to demonstrate it in such a way. Ruth also convinces Harry to reconsider his resignation. In the final episode of series 9 she is captured, handcuffed and gagged by Lucas North as he causes a distraction that enables him to get her into his truck, as a hostage for Harry to deliver to Albany. He secures her to a chair and gags her again, but after giving his demands he ungags her, and when she asks to speak to Lucas he says he is not there. She nearly dies from an anaesthetic drip, though Maya, Lucas's girlfriend, convinces him to tell the team where her location is after he gets the file.

Series 10
Series 10 was confirmed by the BBC and Kudos as being the last series of Spooks to be made. Kudos also told audiences that Ruth's relationship with Harry would be brought to a head.

After being kidnapped by John Bateman (who had been posing as Lucas North since series 7) in series 9 episode 8, Ruth is saved after Harry agrees to give Albany, a State Secret to him in return for her release. Lucas asks Harry to meet him, where it's assumed he'll be killed, however Lucas commits suicide and Harry is told there will be an investigation into his entire career.

Series 10 sees Ruth's relationship with Harry develop a lot further than previous series. In episode 1 Harry is accused of trading away a state secret, the Albany file, in exchange for Ruth's life because of his personal relationship with her. He denies this is the reason and prepares a report detailing her role in several operations. This also catches the attention of the Home Secretary, William Towers.

Harry is reinstated to the Service but on the understanding that Erin Watts, the new Head of Section D, remains Section Chief under his command. Ruth's faith in Harry however becomes strained when faces from his past begin to return. Elena Gavrik and her husband Ilya Gavrik along with their son Sasha are on their way to the UK to sign a new partnership between Britain and Russia. It's revealed that Elena had been an asset of Harry's during the Cold War and that the Gavriks may need protecting. Later Harry finds evidence after a meeting with Sasha Gavrik that someone is impersonating him and asking Elena Gavrik for information about the Russian deal.  He turns to Ruth for help, telling only her that someone had been contacting Elena posing as him. They attend the Russian reception giving Harry the chance to talk to Elena face to face, however Ilya Gavrik is then attacked by an unknown assassin. At the end of the episode Ruth asks Harry what exactly it is he is hiding from her. He reveals that he and Elena had been lovers and that Sasha Gavrik is their son.

In episodes 2 and 3 Harry and Ruth's relationship, both professional and personal, becomes tainted and cooled by his revelations about Elena and Sasha.  Harry is reluctant to talk to her about his son when she insists he is compromised in dealing with any of the Gavriks. Ruth begins to investigate CIA Deputy Director Jim Coaver on Harry's command, since he was the only other person involved in turning Elena into an MI5 asset during the Cold War, but her faith in Harry begins to falter and she turns her attention to his and Coaver's shared past.

Ruth meets Elena to collect the messages sent to her by someone who they believe is Jim Coaver. Elena confronts Ruth about her relationship with Harry, making it clear that she knows Harry is in love with Ruth. However, Ruth finds it difficult to believe and trust Elena as an asset because of her personal feelings for Harry.

In episode 3 the Home Secretary asks Ruth to dinner to discuss a new role for her as his Security Adviser, but torn between her loyalty and love for Harry, she tells him she needs to discuss it with him before she decides on her future.

In episode 4 Ruth and Harry enlist the help of both Elena and Sasha to collect evidence that it is indeed Jim Coaver posing as Harry to gain information on the Russia/UK partnership signing. When they attempt to lure Coaver out, Ruth witnesses an exchange between the CIA asset Veronica Duran (seen in episode 10.1 and revealed to be a CIA asset in episode 10.3) and an unknown, unregistered car. After the exchange, someone attempts to shoot Elena. The shooter misses, and Elena falls to the ground. In shock, she clings to Harry, but Ruth witnesses the moment. Seeing Elena and Harry alone leads her to question Harry's feelings for Elena.

Ruth then meets Jim Coaver alone. He warns her to stop looking into his past but Ruth follows him, and finds that it is his car she saw earlier making the exchange with Duran, playing a key role in gathering evidence against him and proving he is indeed the impersonator. She informs Harry at the end of episode about the Home Secretary's offer. She also questions him about the amount of secrets he has been keeping from her. She asks if there are more, and he answers truthfully that there are. She then asks for his advice on the offer made by Towers.  He encourages her to take it, not because he wants to lose her but because he does not want her involved in what is coming.

In episode 5 Ruth is now working for the Home Office under the command of the Home Secretary, and liaises between both Home Office and Section D. However, when Harry kidnaps Jim Coaver she becomes torn between her love for Harry and loyalty to the Home Secretary. She tries to convince Harry to let Coaver go, believing that he is still in love with Elena Gavrik and its clouding his judgement. She informs the Home Secretary of their whereabouts, but Coaver is taken by a group posing as the CIA and murdered. With his last words Coaver tells Harry that the identity of the true impersonator is on his laptop which had been taken to the American Embassy.

Ruth meets Harry where he explains to her he is not in love with Elena, but what he feels for her guilt over Sasha which later leads her to question if what he also feels for her is guilt. But Ruth admits that she was indeed jealous of his relationship with Elena. He proceeds to ask her to steal Coaver's laptop from the Embassy as she is the only one with enough clearance, however Sasha Gavrik had bugged Harry's car and is aware of their plans to lift the laptop.

Ruth manages to get the laptop successfully but is ambushed by Sasha who threatens to kill her unless she opens the files. Moments later an attempt is made on the Home Secretary's life. Ruth loses the laptop to Sasha, who then finds out that Harry is his father. Harry is then taken into the custody of the CIA.

In the last few scenes of the episode Harry meets the Home Secretary and Ruth on the Southbank where he requests that the signing of the Russian partnership is to be brought forward. Towers accepts and leaves Harry and Ruth alone. Ruth vows to give evidence for him but he declines and apologises for her becoming involved again. She reveals that she has put in an offer on a house in Suffolk, yet she cannot picture herself living there. Harry encourages her to move on with her life. He kisses her and then leaves a tearful Ruth standing on the beach alone.

In the final episode of the show, while the Russian deal is being closed, Ruth helps her former Section D colleagues break Harry out of CIA custody when Elena Gavrik approaches her with information. She tells Ruth about the attacks on her family, the death of Tariq and the assassin sent to kill her husband, she also says there is a new attack planned on the UK and insists she can only talk to Harry face-to-face. Harry and Ruth interrogate Elena. She reveals that neither Ilya nor Jim Coaver were involved but it was her, that she ordered the attacks and that she had been working for a faction of the KGB since Harry had left her during the Cold War. Her role was to become a plant if Harry had taken her and Sasha to the UK as he had planned to before Coaver stopped him.

The attack planned for the UK is a bomb on a plane on its way in from Russia to Heathrow. As they investigate further, Ruth enters the interrogation room alone with Harry and Elena when she finally finds out how exactly Elena was turned by Harry. But she reveals that all along, it was her who was trying to turn Harry and that she was a spy before Harry had even met her. Ruth's view on him though is not tainted, instead it's strengthened, much to Elena's dismay. Elena then also informs Harry that she lied to him for almost 30 years, and that Sasha is not his son... but Ilya's, leaving both Harry and Ruth shocked.

Harry contacts Towers, convinced Elena is telling the truth about the attack but Ruth stops him and questions it, reminding him that she was never his asset and that he doesn't know her or what she is capable of. Ruth speaks to Elena alone and questions her real motives as well as her love for her son Sasha, who she used as an asset to sell the lie to Harry. She sees through Elena's deceptions.
Ruth's suspicions about Elena are confirmed when Harry threatens to kill Sasha. Ruth finds out alone that Elena and her recruiter's real motive is to let the UK start conflict between Britain and Russia by forcing the UK to shoot down a plane full of civilians. Ilya Gavrik, who has joined them in the bunker, overhears everything that is said. He asks to speak to Ruth alone and then asks her for the key to the room where Elena is being held. She agrees, getting the key from Harry and allows him to speak to his wife, making her responsible for what happens next. Ilya then strangles Elena before Erin, Dimitri and Sasha can stop him.

Outside the bunker, Harry is told the plane is now safe and Ruth joins him on the hillside. Ruth tells him that the reason she left was because she thought there would always be too many secrets between them and that one day she might lose herself in the secrets... but that hasn't happened. She then asks Harry to leave the Service with her, retire and they can have a life together.

He accepts, but the moment is broken when Sasha Gavrik appears and threatens to kill Harry after allowing his father into the room to kill his mother. Ruth rushes to protect Harry but instead walks into Sasha where she is accidentally but fatally stabbed. Sasha is disarmed by Dimitri but Ruth collapses in Harry's arms.  While the team attempts to call for help, Ruth begins to slowly slip away while Harry tries to keep her talking until help arrives.

Harry asks about the house she bought in Suffolk. She tells him that she couldn't picture herself living there without him, but he says they will live together. But, soon after, she passes away in his arms. Dimitri attempts to revive her with an adrenaline shot, but it is too late. Harry is left grieving over her as he kisses her goodbye. Calum asks Erin and Dimitri to let them be, and Harry is left alone with Ruth in the field.

Later Harry visits the house Ruth had bought in Suffolk and then also visits the memorial which lists the name of every MI5 officer he has lost engraved into the glass. R. Evershed is now added to that list. Ruth was the last character to be killed on Spooks.

Spooks: The Greater Good
After being blamed for the escape of terrorist Adem Qasim, Harry meets Erin Watts (who has been undercover in Qasim's organization) at Ruth's grave where he cleans up some dead flowers on her tombstone. MI5 leaders who are trying to have Harry found after his alleged death by suicide believe he may have gone rogue as a result of his grief over Ruth's death, an event which had apparently made him colder and more reliant on drink. Later, in Berlin, when Will Halloway asks Harry why he doesn't just disappear and leave the Service to handle itself, Harry says that he won't let people who sacrificed themselves for it, such as Ruth, down by simply walking away.

At the end of the programme, Will informs Harry that he can no longer visit her grave as MI5 had put it under surveillance in case he returned there, a revelation that visibly saddens Harry.

Critical reception
Benji Wilson of The Daily Telegraph commented on series ten finale that "normality returned with the death of Ruth"; and praised Walker's performance stating "an actress who has squeezed every drop out of TV’s greatest ever largely dumbstruck doormat for the best part of a decade. Her scenes with Peter Firth, another fine player, have become self-contained little bubbles of weltschmerz within every recent episode".

References

Television characters introduced in 2003
Fictional people from London
Fictional British secret agents
Spooks (TV series) characters